XYZ is an American hard rock band. It was originally formed in Lyon, France, where Pat Fontaine and Terry Ilous were born and grew up. The first members were Paul Villet on drums, Uncle RV on guitars and Pat Fontaine on vocals and bass. After a few shows as a trio through western Europe and even New York's CBGB, Terry Ilous joined as the lead vocalist, cementing XYZ as a four-piece, and in 1984 the band moved to Los Angeles. Both Villet and RV bowed out a few months later and were replaced by Robert Pieper from New Haven, Connecticut on guitars and Joe Pafumi from Boston, Massachusetts on drums. 

XYZ started off as the unofficial house band of the Whisky a Go Go nightclub in Los Angeles. A tour of the US with Ted Nugent followed the success of their 1989 Enigma-released debut album, which includes one of their best-known songs "Inside Out", and they were signed by major label Capitol for their 1991 follow-up Hungry. XYZ disbanded in 1992 but has reunited occasionally since the early 2000s.

History 
XYZ sold more than two million records worldwide and was a staple on MTV during the early 90s. The band played Hollywood clubs throughout the mid-1980s and first got a record deal in 1989 with Don Dokken (frontman of Dokken) as a producer. Ilous and Fontaine then recruited Marc Diglio (guitars) and Paul Monroe (drums) to replace the departing Pieper and Pafumi, to record the debut album, simply titled XYZ, released in 1989 and containing the hits "Inside Out" and "What Keeps Me Loving You". Videos for both songs received reasonable airplay managing to reach No. 99 on the Billboard 200. A third single from the album, "Maggy", was used in the 1990 Dolph Lundgren movie I Come in Peace. 

The next album, Hungry, released in 1991, had less commercial success, not charting at all. Just one video was released, "Face Down in the Gutter", directed by Michael Bay. A few months later, both Diglio and Monroe left the band and were replaced by Tony Burnett and Joey Shapiro, respectively. After the next tour (Foreigner) was finished, band members went separate ways once again.

They reunited in 2008 with the 1992 lineup of Ilous, Fontaine, Marcus and Shapiro, and still perform to the present day.

Recent events 
XYZ actively continues to play festivals and shows across the US and Europe and is a regular addition to Monster of Rock Cruises out of Miami, Florida. In addition to fronting XYZ, Terry Ilous leads The Vagabonds, an acoustic outfit mixing flamenco with classic rock.

Terry Ilous was interviewed by Argentinean rock journalist Lucas H. Gordon, where the singer talked about a charity event called 80's Rockers for Japan, organized by Ilous to raise money for the Red Cross from Japan, to help victims of the 2011 earthquake and tsunami. The event featured many hard rock musicians, including ex-Toto singer Bobby Kimball, Paul Shortino, Rudy Sarzo, Michael T. Ross, John Payne, Carmine Appice, Vinny Appice, Lorraine Lewis, and others.

XYZ performed at Rocklahoma Festival in 2008, the M3 Rock Festival, Merriweather Post Pavilion, Columbia, MD, and Firefest, Rock City, Nottingham, England, in 2012.

In 2012, drummer Joey Shapiro purchased drumstick and guitar pick grip company Gorilla Snot, and since 2019 owns Avalanche Studios, a recording facility in Denver CO.

Pat Fontaine was featured in the opening scene of The Dirt, a Netflix movie about Mötley Crüe.

Paul Monroe, drummer from the classic lineup, was a contestant with his daughter on a 2016 episode of That Awkward Game Show on Spike TV.

As of March 2022, according to Pat Fontaine, new music from XYZ is in the works.

Members 

Current members
 Patt Fontaine – bass (1980–present)
 Terry Ilous – vocals (1982–present)
 Tony Marcus – guitars (1991–present)
 Joey Shapiro – drums (1991–present)

Former members
 Uncle RV – guitars (1980–1983)
 JP Villet – drums (1980–1983)
 Jamie Lewis – keys (1984–1986)
 Bill Lordan – drums (1984–1986)
 Bobby Pieper – guitars (1984–1988)
 Joey Pafumi – drums (1986–1988)
 Marc Diglio – guitars (1988–1991)
 Paul Monroe – drums (1988–1991, 2003)
 Sean McNabb – bass (2003)
 Tony Burnett – guitars (1991–1993)

Timeline

Discography

Studio albums

Extended plays

Compilation albums

Live albums

References

External links 
 Official website
 
 Interview with XYZ Bassist Patt Fontaine
 Interview with Terry Ilous at Paisajes Eléctricos Magazine (Spanish)

1986 establishments in California
Glam metal musical groups from California
Hard rock musical groups from California
Heavy metal musical groups from California
Musical groups established in 1986
Musical groups disestablished in 1992
Musical groups reestablished in 2002
Musical groups from Los Angeles
Musical quartets